Relatio de Standardo ("An Account of the [Battle of the] Standard"), or De bello standardii ("on the Battle of the Standard"), is a text composed probably in 1153 or 1154 by the Cistercian monk Aelred of Rievaulx, describing the Battle of the Standard, fought near Northallerton in 1138 between David I, King of Scotland, and a Norman army fighting in support of King Stephen of England.

It is notable for being one of Aelred's two most seriously historical or political works, the other being his "Genealogy of the Kings of the English".  The work has no known patron, though it  eulogises Walter Espec and Eustace fitz John and gives a good account of King David; it is hostile towards William fitz Duncan.<ref>Gransden, Historical Writing," p. 215; Freeland and Dutton, Aelred of Rievaulx, pp. 27, 259—60.</ref>

"Relatio" praises the English and Normans fighting on Stephen's behalf and is critical of the Scots and Galwegians. The work has been commented upon by modern historians for its vision of English and Norman unity against the alleged barbarism from the Scots and Galwegians.

According to Gransden it survives in only one manuscript, the famous Corpus Christi College Cambridge MS. 139.

In addition to the narrative of the battle, with the Norman forces fighting under the protection of the saints, this work also explores the nature and value of history and gives some extended attention to the founding of Rievaulx itself.

Notes

References
Bliese, John. “The Battle Rhetoric of Aelred of Rievaulx.” Haskins Society Journal 1 (1989): 99–107.
Burton, Pierre-André. Aelred de Rievaulx (1110–1167): Essai de Biographie Existentielle et Spirituelle. Paris: Les Éditions du Cerf, 2010.
Burton, Pierre-André. “Le Récit de La Bataille de l’Étendard par Aelred de Rievaulx. Présentation et Traduction.” Cîteaux 58 (2007): 7–41.
 
An English translation of this text is on pp. 245—69
Freeman, Elizabeth. “Aelred of Rievaulx’s De Bello Standardii.: Cistercian Historiography and the Creation of Community Memories.” Cîteaux  49.1–2 (1998): 5–28.
Freeman, Elizabeth. “The Many Functions of Cistercian Histories Using Aelred of Rievaulx’s Relatio de Standardo  as a Case Study.” In The Medieval Chronicle: Proceedings of the 1st International Conference on the Medieval Chronicle.  Edited by Erik Kooper. Amsterdam and Atlanta: Rodopi, 1999. 124–132.
Freeman, Elizabeth. Narratives of a New Order: Cistercian Historical Writing in England, 1150–1220.  Turnhout, Belgium: Brepols Publishers, 2002. 
 
 Howlett, Richard (ed.). "Relatio de Standardo", in Chronicles of the reigns of Stephen, Henry II and Richard I, 3, Rerum Britannicarum medii aevi scriptores'', 82, (1886).
For the Latin text, see pp. 179-99
 

12th-century Latin books
Cistercian Order
Latin historical texts from Norman and Angevin England